Mario Alberto Muñoz Rojas (born August 7, 1984) is a Colombian football player who plays for Bogotá F.C.

External links
 Profile - El Gráfico 

1984 births
Living people
Association football goalkeepers
Colombian footballers
Academia F.C. players
Cúcuta Deportivo footballers
Atlético Bucaramanga footballers
Patriotas Boyacá footballers
Bogotá FC footballers
Alianza F.C. footballers
Colombian expatriate footballers
Expatriate footballers in El Salvador
People from Putumayo Department